Thomas or Tom Moody may refer to:

 Thomas Moody (British Army officer) (1779 - 1849), British geopolitical expert
 Thomas Pearson Moody (1841–1917), mining engineer in Australia and New Zealand
 Tom Moody (born 1965), Australian cricketer
 Tom Moody (artist), American artist and art critic
 Tom Moody (businessman) (born 1973), British businessman
 Tom Moody (politician) (1930–2008), American politician and 49th mayor of Columbus, Ohio, USA

See also
 Thomas Moodie (disambiguation)